, known by her stage name , is a Japanese voice actress affiliated with I'm Enterprise.

Filmography

Television animation
Oroshitate Musical Nerima Daikon Brothers as Mako
Otome wa Boku ni Koishiteru as Yukari Kamioka
Ryusei Sentai Musumet as Kurenai Mishina
Star Driver: Kagayaki no Takuto as Kanako Watanabe/Todori
Umineko no Naku Koro ni as Mammon
11eyes: Tsumi to Batsu to Aganai no Shōjo as Lisette Weltall; Liselotte Werckmeister
Go! Princess PreCure as Ayaka Nishimine

Video games
Chaos Rings as Vahti
Azur Lane as USS Downes (DD-375)

External links 
 

1988 births
Living people
Voice actresses from Aomori Prefecture
Japanese voice actresses
21st-century Japanese actresses
I'm Enterprise voice actors